Mircea-Emilian Pârligras (born 28 December 1980) is a Romanian chess grandmaster and a two-time Romanian Chess Champion. As of November 2011, his FIDE rating is 2650, making him the 103rd player in the world.

In 2007 he tied for 2nd–7th with Kiril Georgiev, Dimitrios Mastrovasilis, Vadim Malakhatko, Hristos Banikas and Dmitry Svetushkin in the Acropolis International Chess Tournament. In 2010, tied for 1st–6th with Yuriy Kryvoruchko, Gabriel Sargissian, Sergey Volkov, Bela Khotenashvili and Vladislav Borovikov in 2nd International Chess Tournament in Rethymno. In 2011, he tied for 2nd–4th with Borki Predojević and Hrant Melkumyan in 41st International Bosna Tournament in Sarajevo. He advanced through the 3rd round of the Khanty-Mansiysk 2011 World Cup after knocking out higher rated players such as Yu Yangyi and Zoltán Almási. He was knocked out by Peter Heine Nielsen after the rapid tiebreaks.

He played for Romania in the Chess Olympiads of 2002, 2004, 2006 and 2008.

References

External links 

1980 births
Living people
People from Pitești
Chess grandmasters
Chess Olympiad competitors
Romanian chess players